Lycée Léonard de Vinci is a senior high school/sixth-form college in Saint-Witz, Val-d'Oise, France, in the Paris metropolitan area.

 it has about 600 students.

References

External links
 Lycée Léonard de Vinci 

Lycées in Val-d'Oise